The Third World War, released in Japan as , is a 1993 turn-based strategy game for the Mega-CD developed by Micronet. A Sega Genesis/Mega Drive version was planned, but never released. The objective of the game is to defeat an opponent computer player in order to prevent starting a Third World War.

Gameplay
Players are tasked with competing against a computer player as a nation of their choosing in the past (i.e. during the Cold War), present-day, or future. Each nation has its own strengths and weaknesses, and the player is given a limited number of terms to develop their nation's society, technology, and military power.

Players are able to choose from one of 16 nations to lead: The United States of America, Russia, Japan, Germany,
China, France, the United Kingdom, India, Brazil, Canada, Australia, Iraq, Israel, 
Saudi Arabia, South Africa, or Libya. Several other areas in the map are gray in
most game options and are not selectable to control, but are conquerable (examples would include Cuba, 
Vietnam, Mexico, and Ethiopia).

Victory is achieved in one of two ways: a military victory or an economic victory. To achieve military victory, players must conquer 51 different nations. Once the 51st location is conquered, a small speech by the chosen country's leader will commence.

Reception
Entertainment Weekly gave the game a C and wrote that "Assuming the leadership of any one of 16 countries, players negotiate treaties, deploy armed forces, and shore up their economies in this complex, menu-driven brain strainer. But while it's hard to dislike any game that includes options like 'aid terrorism' and 'manipulate media,' Third World War is a bit dull-by the time the shooting starts, you'll probably have tuned in CNN to catch the real thing."

See also
 Risk; its versions for Commodore 64 and Macintosh computers share several similarities to this game.

References

External links
 Third World War at GameFAQs

1993 video games
Alternate history video games
Cancelled Sega Genesis games
Cold War video games
Micronet co., Ltd. games
Sega CD games
Sega CD-only games
Single-player video games
Video games developed in Japan
Video games set in Africa
Video games set in China
Video games set in Cuba
Video games set in England
Video games set in Iraq
Video games set in Saudi Arabia
Video games set in the United States
World War III video games